Morihanfen Oluwaseun Oluwabamidele (born 15 December 1989), known by his stage name as Sean Tizzle, is a Nigerian singer and songwriter. He was formally signed to Sound Sultan's Naija Ninjas.

Early life and Career 
Sean Tizzle was born into a Christian home in 1989, he is the fourth child in a family of five. Although he was born in Ikeja, he grew up in Ikorodu, and attended Community Grammar School, Majidun as well as the Command Secondary School, Ibadan, he then went on to study theatre arts at the University of Ibadan. He began his music career as a rapper with the 3-Way band.

Sean rose to stardom in 2013 after the release of his smash hit single Sho Lee and thereafter worked with Unlimited L.A to deliver the music video.

In 2014, MTN Nigeria announced the signing of the music artiste on a 20 million naira endorsement deal  He also lands a Bacardi Breezer Ambassador in August of the same year.

Notable performances
He has performed in several popular events, including:
Etisalat (2014) (Easy Cliq Campus Tour)
Ay Live (2013)
Nokia Lumia Party (2013)
Hennessy Artistry (2013)
Star Music Trek (2014)
First Bank
UBA (All About You Debit MasterCard Launch)
Sterling Bank (GetReadyFor Work) 2013
Coko Bar Music Festival (London) 2013
Nea Awards (New-York)
African Social Awards Malaysia ASAM (Malaysia) 2013
Felabration 2013 
GT Bank (End Of The Year Party 2013)
Access Bank plc (End Of The Year Party 2013)
Headies Awards 2013
Lagos Count Down 2013
Uk tour 2014 (6 cities)
Uk tour 2015 (7 cities)
Uk tour 2016 (10 cities)
Tim Westwood
Loud Beach Party (2018)
The Sean Tizzle Experience (2019)

Discography

Studio albums
The Journey (2014)

EPs
Moving Forward (2017)

Singles
Kilogbe
Kilogbe Remix ft. Olamide & Reminisce
Komole(Produced by Aje Filmworks)
Mama Eh
Boogie Down
Sho Lee
International Badman
Abeg (2015)
Kpata Kpata (2016) (As featured artiste)
Perfect Gentleman
Loke Loke (featured 9ice)
Igi Orombo (featured Tiwa Savage)
Abiamo
Eruku Sa’ Ye Po
Jalolo
Like To Party
Hit and Run (featuring Tory Lanez)
Thank You
Telephone man
Roll up
Dide
Alhaji Abass
Latin Lover ft. Daxmpire 
 Arawa ni
Wasted (2018)
Best For you (2018)
Kpro Kpro (2018)
Kpro Kpro remix ft Davido (2018)
Belinda (2018)
Pempe (2018)
Lotto (2019)
 Contagious (2019) 
Abena (2020)
 Oreke (2020)

Film and television

Awards and nominations

See also
List of Nigerian musicians

References

External links

Living people
Yoruba musicians
21st-century Nigerian male singers
The Headies winners
University of Ibadan alumni
Musicians from Lagos
1989 births